Maribyrnong Immigration Detention Centre was an Australian immigration detention facility in Maribyrnong, Victoria. The centre was originally opened in 1950, as the Maribyrnong Migrant Hostel, then later the Midway (Migrant) Hostel in the late 1960s. The Phillip Migrant Hostel was added later. It closed on 31 December 2018.

The Maribyrnong Immigration Detention Centre was opened in 1983, set up for people who had over-stayed their visas, had their visa cancelled, or who had been denied entry into the country through international airports and seaports. Maribyrnong Immigration Detention Centre was operated by Global Solutions Limited, formerly part of Group 4 Securicor on behalf of the Australian Government from 27 August 2003, along with all other Australian immigration detention centres until at least 2009.

Most of the original facility became "The Student Village" (a student accommodation facility for two antecedents of Victoria University, plus RMIT and University of Melbourne) in 1989. Victoria University took over sole responsibility for the student accommodation in the 1990s. In the 2000s what was the Phillip Hostel was demolished and redeveloped as private housing.

In January 2016 a report revealed that Maribyrnong was the harshest immigration prison in Australia, with guards handcuffing and using force against detainees at a far higher rate than in other immigration prisons.

See also
List of Australian immigration detention facilities

References

External links

Visiting our very own detention centre

G4S
Immigration detention centres and prisons of Australia
Private prisons in Australia
1983 establishments in Australia
Maribyrnong, Victoria
2018 disestablishments in Australia